Delft Campus railway station is a railway station in Delft, Netherlands, located on the railway line between The Hague and Rotterdam. The railway station was opened on 31 May 1970. The station building was demolished in June 2006. The name of the station was Delft Zuid until 14 December 2019.

The station area is dominated by the overpassing viaduct, which carries the Kruithuisweg, a provincial highway, over the railroad. The viaduct is also used by pedestrians and travellers to reach the platforms at the other side.

Train services

The following services call at Delft Campus:
4x per hour local service (sprinter) The Hague CS - Rotterdam - Dordrecht (Mon-Fri 5 a.m. - 20 p.m.)
2x per hour local service (sprinter) The Hague CS - Rotterdam - Dordrecht (Mon-Fri after 20 p.m., all weekend)

Gallery

References

External links 
Spoorzone Delft Zuid 
stationsweb.nl
NS website 
Dutch Public Transport journey planner 

Railway stations in South Holland
Railway stations opened in 1970
Railway stations on the Oude Lijn
Buildings and structures in Delft
1970 establishments in the Netherlands
Railway stations in the Netherlands opened in the 20th century